Chocapic (also known as Koko Krunch in Asia and most of the Middle East) is a chocolate-flavored whole-grain breakfast cereal distributed by Nestlé in most of Europe, Asia, the Middle-East and Latin America. The cereal was introduced in 1984. It has since been available to consumers in Portugal since 1986.

Overview 
The cereal consists of cocoa flavored wheat flakes. Chocapic is available in 30 grams, and 375 grams packages. The cereal's mascot is Pico (Koko the Koala in Asia), a dog that loves chocolate, and is always referring to the fact that Chocapic has a strong chocolate flavour. In later advertisements he is seen with a child preventing several thieves from stealing the cereal and explaining the origin of Chocapic (the most usual explanation being that a balloon filled with chocolate burst and landed in a field, creating the choco petals).
A new product related to this cereal, Chocapic Duo, has been recently created, which features the usual chocolate petals, and also features white chocolate flavored petals as well.

Similar products
Similar in flavor and texture to Chocos by Kellogg's. Somewhat similar to other chocolate-flavored cereals like Cocoa Krispies and Cocoa Puffs.

References

External links 
 

1984 establishments in Switzerland
Products introduced in 1984
Nestlé cereals